Pat or Patrick Barry may refer to:
Patrick Barry (horticulturist) (1816–1890), American horticulturist
Patrick Barry (bishop) (1868–1940), American Roman Catholic bishop
Patrick Barry (judge) (1898–1972), British judge
Pat Barry (hurler) (born 1951), hurler and Gaelic footballer
Pat Barry (kickboxer) (born 1979), American kickboxer, sanshou practitioner, and mixed martial art fighter

See also
Paddy Barry (disambiguation)
Patricia Barry (1921–2016), American actress